Wabamun Lake Provincial Park is a provincial park in Alberta, Canada.

It is located on the north-eastern shore of Wabamun Lake, near the hamlet of Wabamun, bordering the Yellowhead Highway.

Activities
The following activities are available in the park:
Baseball and soccer
Beach activities (swimming, water-skiing and windsurfing)
Birdwatching (hooded merganser, bald eagle, mallard, gull, tern, rail, heron, loon, kingfisher, sandpiper, nesting osprey, red-necked grebe, western grebe, raven, Canada jay, great grey owl)
Camping
Canoeing and kayaking
Fishing (stickleback, burbot, Iowa darter, lake whitefish, northern pike, shiner, walleye, white sucker, yellow perch)
Front country hiking (with boardwalks in day use area)
Power boating and sailing

See also
List of provincial parks in Alberta
List of Canadian provincial parks
List of National Parks of Canada

References

External links

Parkland County
Provincial parks of Alberta